The Xylariales are an order of fungi within the class Sordariomycetes (also known as Pyrenomycetes), subdivision Pezizomycotina, division Ascomycota. It was the original order of the subclass Xylariomycetidae. Xylariales was circumscribed in 1932 by Swedish mycologist John Axel Nannfeldt, and Xylariomycetidae by Ove Erik Eriksson and Katarina Winka in 1997. In 2020, more families (and genera) were added to the order.

Type: Xylaria 

DNA analysis in 2018 confirmed the placement of the order and subclass, it is a sister to the Amphisphaeriales order.

Families
As accepted by Wijayawardene et al. 2020 (with amount of genera);

 Anungitiomycetaceae (3)
 Barrmaeliaceae (2)
 Cainiaceae (10)

 Clypeosphaeriaceae (7)
 Coniocessiaceae (2)
 Diatrypaceae (22)
 Fasciatisporaceae (1)
 Graphostromataceae (5)
 Hansfordiaceae (1)
 Hypoxylaceae (18)

 Induratiaceae (2)
 Lopadostomataceae (4)
 Microdochiaceae (3)
 Polystigmataceae (1)
 Nothodactylariaceae (1
 Requienellaceae (4)
 Xyladictyochaetaceae (2)
 Xylariaceae (38)
 Zygosporiaceae (1) 

Familia incertae sedis: Myelospermataceae

Genera incertae sedis:
Adomia
Diamantinia
Lasiobertia
Palmicola
Pulmosphaeria
Yuea

References

 
Ascomycota orders
Lichen orders
Taxa named by John Axel Nannfeldt
Taxa described in 1932